Algebraic-group factorisation algorithms are algorithms for factoring an integer N by working in an algebraic group defined modulo N whose group structure is the direct sum of the 'reduced groups' obtained by performing the equations defining the group arithmetic modulo the unknown prime factors p1, p2, ...  By the Chinese remainder theorem, arithmetic modulo N corresponds to arithmetic in all the reduced groups simultaneously.

The aim is to find an element which is not the identity of the group modulo N, but is the identity modulo one of the factors, so a method for recognising such one-sided identities is required. In general, one finds them by performing operations that move elements around and leave the identities in the reduced groups unchanged. Once the algorithm finds a one-sided identity all future terms will also be one-sided identities, so checking periodically suffices.

Computation proceeds by picking an arbitrary element x of the group modulo N and computing a large and smooth multiple Ax of it; if the order of at least one but not all of the reduced groups is a divisor of A, this yields a factorisation. It need not be a prime factorisation, as the element might be an identity in more than one of the reduced groups.

Generally, A is taken as a product of the primes below some limit K, and Ax is computed by successive multiplication of x by these primes; after each multiplication, or every few multiplications, the check is made for a one-sided identity.

The two-step procedure 
This means that a two-step procedure becomes sensible, first computing Ax by multiplying x by all the primes below a limit B1, and then examining p Ax for all the primes between B1 and a larger limit B2.

Methods corresponding to particular algebraic groups 

If the algebraic group is the multiplicative group mod N, the one-sided identities are recognised by computing greatest common divisors with N, and the result is the p − 1 method.

If the algebraic group is the multiplicative group of a quadratic extension of N, the result is the p + 1 method; the calculation involves pairs of numbers modulo N.  It is not possible to tell whether  is actually a quadratic extension of  without knowing the factorisation of N. This requires knowing whether t is a quadratic residue modulo N, and there are no known methods for doing this without knowledge of the factorisation. However, provided N does not have a very large number of factors, in which case another method should be used first, picking random t (or rather picking A with t = A2 − 4) will accidentally hit a quadratic non-residue fairly quickly. If t is a quadratic residue, the p+1 method degenerates to a slower form of the p − 1 method.

If the algebraic group is an elliptic curve, the one-sided identities can be recognised by failure of inversion in the elliptic-curve point addition procedure, and the result is the elliptic curve method; Hasse's theorem states that the number of points on an elliptic curve modulo p is always within  of p.

All three of the above algebraic groups are used by the  GMP-ECM package, which includes efficient implementations of the two-stage procedure, and an implementation of the PRAC group-exponentiation algorithm which is rather more efficient than the standard binary exponentiation approach.

The use of other algebraic groups—higher-order extensions of N or groups corresponding to algebraic curves of higher genus—is occasionally proposed, but almost always impractical. These methods end up with smoothness constraints on numbers of the order of pd for some d > 1, which are much less likely to be smooth than numbers of the order of p.

Integer factorization algorithms